FabricLive.82 is a DJ mix album by English drum and bass musicians Ed Rush and Optical. The album was released in July 2015 as part of the FabricLive Mix Series.

Track listing

External links

FabricLive.82 at Fabric

References

Fabric (club) albums
2015 compilation albums